Calvin Howarth (born 18 June 1976 in Auckland, New Zealand) is a New Zealand born former Scotland 'A' international rugby union player. He plays at Fly-half.

Howarth was selected for Scotland A on the basis of a four-year residency period and played in Scotland's match against Romania in 2002 to confirm his Scottish nationality. His older brother Shane Howarth represented both New Zealand and Wales.

He moved from New Zealand where he played for North Harbour to Scotland. Playing for Boroughmuir from 1998 he helped the team rise through the divisions and also won the BT Cellnet Cup in 2001 beating Melrose. He secured a place with professional district side Edinburgh in 2001.

He was loaned to Glasgow Warriors in March 2002 when their fly-half Barry Irving was injured, as cover for their Cook Islands international fly-half Tommy Hayes. This move became permanent for the 2002-03 season.

He stayed at Glasgow Warriors until 2006-07 season when he moved to Italian side Viadana and stayed there until 2009.

Now back in Auckland, New Zealand, Howarth is a real estate consultant.

References

External links
ESPN biography
Statbunker biography
Pro12 biography

1976 births
Living people
Scottish rugby union players
Edinburgh Rugby players
Glasgow Warriors players
Rugby Viadana players
Boroughmuir RFC players
Stirling County RFC players
Rugby union players from Auckland
Rugby union fly-halves
North Harbour rugby union players
Scotland 'A' international rugby union players